Buckton is a small village, which is part of the civil parish of Bempton in the East Riding of Yorkshire, England. It lies on the B1229 road.

The village is adjacent to Bempton, and shares the same local services. To the west of the village is Buckton Hall, a grade II* listed building with large cellars. The hall had a tunnel which connected with the bottom of the cliffs which allowed for smuggling activities and as late as 1931, a hoist for hauling contraband, was still in the kitchen.

Buckton is a good place to find migrant birds, along Hoddy Cows Lane which runs from Buckton Cliffs to the north of the village. The cliffs at Buckton form part of the  coastal region between Speeton and Bempton that is noted for its chalk face and its seabird habitats. This is administered by the RSPB as part of Bempton Cliffs. Up until 1954, tenant farmers from Buckton and Bempton used to climb down the cliffs and collect bird's eggs, a practice known locally as "Climming".

History
From the mediaeval era to the 19th century, Buckton was part of Dickering Wapentake.
Between 1894 and 1974 Buckton was a part of the Bridlington Rural District, in the East Riding of Yorkshire. In 1935, Buckton parish was abolished and added to an enlarged Bempton parish. Between 1974 and 1996, it was part of the Borough of North Wolds (later Borough of East Yorkshire), Humberside.

See also
HMS G3, wrecked at Buckton
Sir Peter Buckton (1350 – 4 March 1414), politician, soldier and knight from Buckton

References

External links

RSPB webpage about the Climmers

Villages in the East Riding of Yorkshire